Muja or MUJA may refer to:

 Muja, Ethiopia, a town
 Muja Power Station, in Western Australia
 Ichigkat muja – Cordillera del Condor National Park, a protected area in Peru
 Jurassic Museum of Asturias (MUJA), Jurassic Museum of Asturias, Spain
 Muja (alligator)
 Muja EP

Surname 
 Arta Muja, German model
 Arbnor Muja, Kosovan professional footballer
 Alban Muja, Kosovo artist and film-maker
 Muja Messiah, an American rapper
 Arta Muja